The Targum Sheni ("Second Targum") is an Aramaic translation (targum) and elaboration of the Book of Esther, that embellishes the Biblical account with considerable new apocryphal material, not on the face of it directly related to the Esther story.

Differences from the Book of Esther 
The Jewish Encyclopedia characterizes the story as a "genuine and exuberant midrash", i.e. a free elaboration, of a kind not unusual in Rabbinic literature.

One notable addition to the story involves King Solomon holding a feast for the daunting army of animals, birds and demonic spirits he has as subjects. But the woodcock refuses to attend, on the grounds that Solomon is inferior to the Queen of Sheba to King Solomon. Solomon sends for the Queen, and houses her in a room made of glass, through which he reveals that she has a hairy foot. She demands from him the answer to three riddles before she will pay homage:
 A cistern of wood; buckets of water; they draw up stones; they cause water to flow. — A tube of cosmetic eye-paint.
 What is the thing which comes as dust from the earth, easts dust, is poured out as water, and sticks to the house? — Naphtha.
 What is that which acts as an oracle (or as a storm), goes at the head of all, cries loudly and bitterly with its head bowed down like a rush, is a cause of praise to the free, of shame to the poor, of honour to the dead, of disgrace to the living, of joy to the birds, and of grief to the fish? — Flax.
Solomon solves the riddles, and the two exchange gifts. The riddles are noteworthy examples of Hebrew Riddles.

Date 
There is controversy among scholars about the date of the Targum Sheni. Various 19th-century scholars dated it to the 4th century (S. Gelbhaus), 6th century (P. Cassel), or 11th century (L. Munk). The Encyclopaedia Judaica argued for a dating of the late 7th or early 8th century. Linguistic features of the (Galilean) Aramaic text, including its many Greek loan words, are one of the stronger arguments in support of an earlier dating. More recently Allegra Iafrate (2015) argued for a date in the 10th century due to the fact that Targum Sheni shows dependency on and shares striking similarities with De Ceremoniis, a work which itself was composed in the middle of the 10th century in the Byzantine Empire.

There are a number of notable parallels between the Targum Sheni account and the Qur'anic account of Solomon and the Queen in Sura 27 (and also some notable differences), and much of the controversy centers on whether these similarities support an earlier or later dating, that is, which composition exerted influence on the other. The ascribed date of 800 by the Encyclopaedia Judaica is post-Islamic so the Targum Sheni may have been influenced by the Qur'an. However, some scholars believe that the Qur'anic account islamicises pre-existing Jewish and folkloric traditions, perhaps including sixth-century Christian input, which were closer to those presented in the Targum Sheni.

References

See also
Apocryphal Additions to Esther - Jewish Encyclopedia
An explanatory commentary on Esther. Contains a translation of Targum Sheni in Appendix 1.

Midrashim
Targums
Book of Esther
Oral Torah